Small Inlet Marine Provincial Park is a provincial park in British Columbia, Canada on the northwest side of Quadra Island, near the city of Campbell River.

It is named after Squadron Leader Norville Small, a decorated officer who was referred to as a leader, tactician, and innovator.

References

Provincial Parks of the Discovery Islands
Provincial parks of British Columbia
Protected areas established in 1996
1996 establishments in British Columbia
Marine parks of Canada